André Breitenreiter (born 2 October 1973) is a German professional football coach and former player. In 2022, he won the Swiss title with Zürich.

Playing career

Breitenreiter played for Hannoverscher SC, Borussia Hannover, Hannover 96, Hamburger SV, VfL Wolfsburg, SpVgg Unterhaching, SC Langenhagen, KSV Hessen Kassel, Holstein Kiel, BV Cloppenburg and TSV Havelse. He played 144 Bundesliga matches scoring 28 goals and 101 2. Bundesliga matches with 14 goals.

Managerial career
Breitenreiter started his coaching career in 2009 and worked as scout for 1. FC Kaiserslautern. On 3 January 2011, he was appointed as head coach of TSV Havelse, club playing in Regionalliga Nord. In 2012, he won Lower Saxony Cup with TSV Havelse. On 15 May 2013, it was announced that Breitenreiter would take over SC Paderborn 07 starting in the 2013–14 season. On 11 May 2014, his club gained promotion to Bundesliga for the first time ever in club's history. On 20 September 2014, after four undefeated games (two wins, two draws) in the German top tier, Paderborn was top of the league, ahead of European powerhouses Bayern Munich, Borussia Dortmund and Bayer Leverkusen. Breitenreiter became the 14th head coach for Schalke 04 in the last decade on 12 June 2015. He left the club after a single season. He was appointed as the new head coach for Hannover 96 on 20 March 2017. He was sacked on 27 January 2019. In May 2022, he signed for 1899 Hoffenheim. He was sacked the following 6 February 2023, with the club three points above the relegation zone.

Coaching record

Honours

Player
Hannover 96
DFB-Pokal: 1991–92

Manager
TSV Havelse
Lower Saxony Cup: 2012

SC Paderborn
2. Bundesliga runner-up: 2013–14

FC Zürich
Swiss Super League: 2022

References

External links

1973 births
Living people
German footballers
Footballers from Lower Saxony
Association football midfielders
Germany under-21 international footballers
Germany youth international footballers
Bundesliga players
2. Bundesliga players
Regionalliga players
Oberliga (football) players
Hannoverscher SC players
Hannover 96 players
Hamburger SV players
VfL Wolfsburg players
SpVgg Unterhaching players
KSV Hessen Kassel players
Holstein Kiel players
TSV Havelse players
German football managers
Bundesliga managers
2. Bundesliga managers
Swiss Super League managers
TSV Havelse managers
SC Paderborn 07 managers
FC Schalke 04 managers
Hannover 96 managers
FC Zürich managers
German expatriate football managers
Expatriate football managers in Switzerland
German expatriate sportspeople in Switzerland
TSG 1899 Hoffenheim managers
West German footballers